Cyrus Frisch (born 1969 in Amsterdam) is a Dutch avant-garde film maker. Filmmaker magazine called him the wild man of Dutch film.  According to Holland Film, Frisch is one of the most daring film makers currently working in the Netherlands.

His debut feature film Forgive Me, meant as a critique of reality-TV culture, premiered at the International Film Festival Rotterdam in 2001 and set his name as a controversial filmmaker. Frisch himself plays the lead in that film. He pretends to be a devilish director without any ethical boundaries in search for the ultimate, exciting (fiction) film. He uses a group of (real) social outcasts and mentally handicapped as actors.

Frisch is known to have made the first fictional feature film shot with a mobile phone: Why Didn't Anybody Tell Me It Would Become This Bad in Afghanistan, that premiered at major film festivals: the International Film Festival Rotterdam 2007, Tribeca Film Festival 2007, the San Francisco International Film Festival 2007, Pesaro 2007, and several others. According to Dutch newspaper Trouw, Frisch pinpoints the insanity of western society nowadays with this film as precisely as Polanski did in the 1960s with Repulsion (31 May 2007). In Film Comment Magazine (March–April 2010) Olaf Muller argues that Frisch's films "embody the stupor we're in as a civilization". The Observer writes: "Frisch is a celebrity in the Netherlands, known for tackling difficult subjects." After graduating from Dutch Film Academy in 1992 he was nominated for the Grolsch Award, one of the most prestigious film awards in the Netherlands.

In 2009, Frisch finished Dazzle (aka Oogverblindend), which he started shooting 15 years earlier, with Dutch star-actress Georgina Verbaan and Rutger Hauer in the lead. Indiewire's Eric Kohn describes Dazzle as a super-cool cinematic challenge. A Repulsion-like thriller stuffed into the aesthetics of a Chris Marker diary film. According to the Tribeca Film Festival catalogue, in Dazzle, "Frisch creates his own unique vision of a socially engaged cinema." Dazzle is said to be Hauer's first film in his home country in 29 years.

Frisch also became known as a playwright. Gharb, "A short, sharp, blast of a play" (The Stage, 15 October 2004) was performed in different languages in the Netherlands, France, Austria and England in 2004.

Filmography
Dazzle (aka Oogverblindend) (2009)
Blackwater Fever (feature film) (2008)
Ellen ten Damme, "Stay" (music video)
Why Didn't Anybody Tell Me It Would Become This Bad in Afghanistan / Waarom heeft niemand mij verteld dat het zo erg zou worden in Afghanistan (feature film) (2007)
Forgive Me (feature film) (2001)
Geen titel (medium-length documentary film) (1996)
I Shall Honour Your Life (short documentary film) (1996)
Live Experimenteren (medium-length documentary film) (1995)
Selfpity / Zelfbeklag (experimental film) (1993)
Welcome 2 (short film) (1992)
Screentest (short film) (1992)
Welcome 1 (short film) (1991)
De Kut van Maria (short film) (1990)

References

External links

Review of Blackwater Fever

1969 births
Living people
Mass media people from Amsterdam
Dutch film directors